Samalpatti is a town in Uthanagarai Taluk in Krishnagiri district, Tamil Nadu, India. Samalpatti is a main railway station in Krishnagiri district. It lies in NH 77. It is 40 km from Krishnagiri and 10 km from Uthangarai.

Nearest railway stations

Nearest villages 
 Subbramaniya Nagar (NGS Nagar)
 Gullampatti
 Kanichi
 Oddapatti
 Parasanur
 Jogipatti
 Nagalpatti
 S.Motur
 Pasanthi
 Kumarampatti

Schools 
 Government Higher Secondary School Samalpatti
 Vijay Christ Primary School Samalpatti
 Gerigapalli Hsr School
 Crist Matric School Suresh
 Vetri Vikas Matriculation School Oddapatti
 Govt Boys Higher Secondary School Uthangarai
 Govt. Girls Higher Secondary School Uthangarai
 Government Higher Sec School Karappattu

Nearest School 
 RPS Matriculation School, Pappanur
 Dheeran Chinnamalai School (CBSC)

Nearest College 
 Adhiyaman Arts & Science College for Women

Temples 
 Sri Vinayagar and Mariyamman Kovil Temple, Samalpatti
 Sri Kanichi Perumal Temple, Kanichi
 Sri Periya Muthu Mariyamman Temple, Subbramaniya Nagar
 Sri Kolkata Kali Amman temple

Nearest Temple 
 Sri Ezhur Mariyamman Kovil, Thippampatti X-road

Banks 
 Karur Vysya Bank 
 Thodakka Velanmai Kooturavu Society (Under Govt of Tamilnadu)
 Tamilnadu Grama Bank (Unit of Indian Bank)

Offices 
 Post Office
 VAO office
 Panchayat Office
 RI Office

Station 
 Police Station
 Railway station

References

External links 
 Satellite map of Samalpatti
 About Samalpatti

Villages in Krishnagiri district